Eisenbahn is a microbrewery in Blumenau, Santa Catarina, Brazil. It produces beer following the Reinheitsgebot, with a variety of flavours and fermentations. "Eisenbahn" means railroad in German and refers to a station that was close to the building now used by the company as a bar and beer production base. Eisenbahn was founded in 2002, and is currently owned by Heineken N.V., who acquired Eisenbahn's then-parent company Brasil Kirin (formerly known as Schincariol) in 2017.

Although Eisenbahn is a small brewery, it has gained most medals of all Brazilian brewers. At the European Beer Star competition held in Germany in 2009, their Dunkel dark beer received the gold medal. In England in 2008, Eisenbahn 5 and Kölsch were voted best beers in the world in the categories of Premium Lager and Standard Pale Ale respectively.

Beers

External links 
 RateBeer
 Eisenbahn official page (Portuguese)
 Shelton Brothers — U.S. importers of Eisenbahn

Beer in Brazil
Blumenau
German-Brazilian culture